Marquise Hill (August 7, 1982 – May 28, 2007) was an American football defensive end for the New England Patriots of the National Football League (NFL). He was drafted by the Patriots in the second round of the 2004 NFL Draft. He played college football at LSU.

High school career
Hill attended De La Salle High School in New Orleans, where he was named as an All-American and the best defensive lineman in the nation by many publications. He was recruited by LSU. He participated in the first-ever U.S. Army All-American Bowl game on December 30, 2000.

College career
Hill played college football as a defensive end for the LSU Tigers from 2001-2003 during their national championship season.

Professional career
Hill was drafted by the Patriots in the second round with the 63rd overall pick in the 2004 NFL Draft. He played in one game in 2004 and played in eight games in the 2005 season, making three tackles.

Death
On the evening of May 27, 2007, Hill and his friend, Ashley Blazio, fell off a jet ski in Lake Pontchartrain, north of New Orleans. Neither of them wore personal flotation or tracking devices. According to Hill's agent, who spoke with Blazio, Hill "ended up saving her life, keeping her calm until she could grab onto a buoy." Blazio was rescued and sent to Tulane Medical Center. Coast Guard units searched the area. Hill's body was found by the Louisiana Department of Wildlife and Fisheries around 2:20 PM CDT on May 28.

Throughout their near-perfect 2007 season, the Patriots team wore a "91" insignia (Hill's number in his tenure with New England) on the back of their helmets in his honor. Teammate Jarvis Green, who had also been Hill's teammate at LSU, wore Hill's shoulder pads for the season. The Patriots built a tribute to Hill, including those pads and pictures of Hill, at their facility.

See also
List of American football players who died during their careers

References

Further reading

External links
New England Patriots bio

1982 births
2007 deaths
Players of American football from New Orleans
American football defensive ends
African-American players of American football
New England Patriots players
LSU Tigers football players
Deaths by drowning in the United States
Accidental deaths in Louisiana
Burials in Louisiana
20th-century African-American sportspeople
21st-century African-American sportspeople